Crystal Pool may refer to:

Swimming pools and natatoriums 
 Crystal Pool (Seattle), a former natatorium and event center in Seattle, Washington, US
 Crystal Pool, a swimming pool at Knoebels Amusement Resort, Elysburg, Pennsylvania, US
 Crystal Pool and Fitness Centre, in Victoria, Canada 
 Crystal Pool, a former swimming pool at Glen Echo Park in Glen Echo, Maryland, US
 Crystal Pool, a former swimming pool at Keansburg Amusement Park in Keansburg, New Jersey, US

Natural pools 
 Crystal Pool, a pool in Ash Meadows, Nevada, US, home to the Crystal Spring springsnail
 Crystal Pool, a rock pool in Norfolk Island, Australia, as listed in Postage stamps and postal history of Norfolk Island

See also 
 Crystal Lake (disambiguation)